La Musica Deuxième is a play written by Marguerite Duras, published in 1985 by Éditions Gallimard. It is an extension of the work La Musica.

The plot 
La Musica Deuxième tells the story of a man and woman who reunite three years after they have separated, to finalize their divorce. Though they have begun new lives, their history and a shared nostalgia lead them to each other. Through conversation they reconstruct their past, revealing misunderstandings and betrayals.

References

1985 plays
Éditions Gallimard books